Koninki – settlement in the Lesser Poland Voivodeship, Poland, situated at the south-east end of the so-called Poręba key. Administratively, part of village Poręba Wielka, Limanowa County. Koninki is a tourist centre on the border of the Gorczański National Park at the foot of the Tobołów mountain (957 m n.p.m.) fitted with a chairlift. The town is an excellent base for treks into the Gorce Mountains. A Koninka river flows through the town.

Two tourist trails lead from Koninki toward the Turbacz mountain (blue and green). In winter the ski lift is used mainly by skiers reaching the Tobołów slopes, the longest ski run in the Gorce Mountains. The base station of the ski-lift is situated in the former leisure centre of the Sendzimir Steelworks from Kraków. In the 18th century the area, on which the centre is situated, called Hucisko, contained a glass factory.

Koninki's biggest vacation centre is called Ostoja Górska with 200 accommodations, the ski station, and the popular chairlift to the top of Tobołów mountain. In the centre of Koninki there is a small chapel which, according to legend, stopped a cholera epidemic.

Notable individuals 
 Polish writer Władysław Orkan, born in Poręba Wielka

References 
 Koninki, oficjalna strona o miejscowości Koninki
 Kolejką linowa na górę Tobołów

Cities and towns in Lesser Poland Voivodeship